St. Theresa of Lisieux Catholic Church, Vellayambalam is a Latin Catholic church in Vellayambalam junction, in the city of Trivandrum, capital of the state of Kerala, India. It is dedicated to Saint Thérèse of Lisieux.It is very close to the Arch Bishop's residence & The Raj Bhavan (Kerala).

Parish

The Parish of the St. Theresa of Lisieux Catholic Church is under the care of 
In addition to being the Parish Priest Fr. Gladin also has the duties of being the Judicial Vicar, Archdiocese of Trivandrum.

Church address is: St. Theresa of Lisieux Church, Vellayambalam, Trivandrum - 695 003, Telephone 0471- 2316734

History

The church started as a small group of people from the areas of Vellayambalam, Sasthamangalam, Kowdiar, and many surrounding areas. The people got together at a small Shed beside the existing church building. At the beginning there used to be Mass in the Malayalam language. Later they had English mass as well. To this day this continues. There is English Mass Every Sunday after the Malayalam Mass. After the year 2000 the parishioners decided to build a new church building. The number of people arriving for mass was more than what could be accommodated in the shed that was used. With the donations and efforts of many people, they constructed a new church.

Mass timings

Sunday- 06:45am (Malayalam) 09.30am (English)

Weekdays- 06:30 am (Malayalam)

Weekdays- 07:30 pm (English) Jesus Youth

Eucharistic Adoration	06.00am - 6.30am

Confession 	Daily 06.00am - 06.30am

References

Sources

 Church document 
 Mass Timings

External links
Official website

Roman Catholic churches in Thiruvananthapuram
Church buildings with domes